Stowlangtoft is a village and civil parish in the Mid Suffolk district of Suffolk in eastern England two miles south-east from Ixworth. Located around five miles north-east of Bury St Edmunds, in 2005 its population was 270.

Name
The village, originally just Stow, was held by the de Languetot family in the early 13th century.

St George's Church
For all of Stowlangtoft's small size, St George's is within the group classed as "Great Churches". Simon Jenkins included it in his book England's Thousand Best Churches.  The church was built as a single construction project in the late 14th century and barely changed until the restoration work undertaken in the 19th century. The church is in the decorated and later English styles; the chancel contains several richly-carved stalls and monuments to members of the family of D'Ewes. The church and parsonage-house are located on what was once the site of a Roman encampment. Peter Tillemans, one of the founders of the English school of sporting painting, was buried in St George's on 7 December 1734.

Samuel Rickards was rector here for several decades in the mid nineteenth century.

At some point after the Dissolution of the monasteries, St George's acquired six 14th-century misericords. It is not clear where these misericords originated, but possible candidates are Thetford Priory or Bury Abbey.

Stowlangtoft Hall
 
Sir Symonds D'Ewes, Bart., the eminent antiquary, lived in Stowlangtoft Hall. The Hall was rebuilt in 1859 for Fuller Maitland Wilson.

In 2011 a gruesome-looking tree in the grounds the hall attracted public attention.

Notable residents

Thomas Rawlinson, Lord Mayor of London in 1753
Charles Wombwell, cricketer
Frank Chapman, priest and Archdeacon of Sudbury
Fuller Maitland Wilson (MP),
Henry Fuller Maitland Wilson, army officer, son of Fuller Maitland Wilson
Samuel Rickards, clergyman, opponent of the Oxford Movement
D'Ewes baronets

References

External links
Photos

Villages in Suffolk
Civil parishes in Suffolk
Mid Suffolk District